Tales of Creation is the fourth album by Swedish doom metal band Candlemass released in 1989 and reissued in 2001 with a bonus CD.

Some of the material from this album ("Dark Reflections", "Under the Oak", "Into the Unfathomed Tower", "Somewhere in Nowhere" and "A Tale of Creation") were originally recorded in 1985 by one of the earliest incarnations of Candlemass. "Under the Oak" is actually a remake of a song from their 1986 debut Epicus Doomicus Metallicus. The cover art is a modified Gustave Doré's work "The Creation of Light".

Tales of Creation was also the last Candlemass album to feature vocalist Messiah Marcolin until he returned for the self-titled album in 2005.

Track listing

Personnel
Candlemass
Messiah Marcolin - vocals
Lars "Lasse" Johansson - lead guitars
Mats "Mappe" Björkman - rhythm guitars
Leif Edling - bass
Jan Lindh - drums

Additional musicians
Jim Bachman - narration
Jay Larssen - narration

Production
Mats Lindfors - producer, mixing
Micke Mårtensson - artwork, layout

Charts

References

Candlemass (band) albums
1987 albums
Music for Nations albums
Enigma Records albums
Metal Blade Records albums